Myrmica laurae is a species of ant. It does not have a common name. The ant is found in Italy. It is considered vulnerable on the IUCN Red List.

References
IUCN Red List

Hymenoptera of Europe
Myrmica
Insects described in 1907